Denegri is an Italian surname. Notable people with the surname include:

Alberto Denegri, Peruvian football player
Aurelio Denegri, Prime Minister of Peru in 1881
Gustavo Denegri (born 1937), Italian billionaire, chairman of DiaSorin
Jerko Ješa Denegri (born 1936), Serbian art historian and art critic
Marco Aurelio Denegri (born 1938), Peruvian intellectual

Italian-language surnames